Glagolitic Alley is a memorial composed of a string of eleven outdoor monuments dotting the road between the villages Roč and Hum in Croatia. Sculptures were erected between 1977 and 1985 to honor the historical Croatian scribal tradition in Glagolitic script.

History
Idea for the memorial was conceived by a writer Zvane Črnja, while the individual monuments themselves were worked out by a sculptor Želimir Janeš and a literary historian Josip Bratulić. Alley shows the path of Istrian, Croatian and Slavic Glagolitic tradition, illustrating the centers of Croatian Glagolitic medieval literature in Istria, suggesting its Slavic roots and literacy and its continuity from the 11th century to the present day.

Monuments
The memorial is composed of eleven individual monuments, ten of which are made of stone, and one (City Gate) made of copper. The monuments appear along the road as following:
 Pillar of the Čakavian Parliament (1977) - in the form of Glagolitic letter S symbolizing logos, mind, reason
 Table of Cyril and Methodius (1978) - a three-legged table before two cypresses which symbolize the two brothers
 Assembly of Clement of Ohrid (1978) - Clement was the student of the Cyril and Methodios and the founder of the first Slavic literary school
 Glagolitic Lapidarium (1984) - copies of the most important Glagolitic monuments from regions of the former Yugoslavia
 Gorge of Croatian Lucidarius - symbolizing the Istrian Mount Olympus: Učka
 Belvedere of Grgur Ninski - a stone book with Glagolitic, Cyrillic and Latin letters inscribed
 The Rise of the Istrian Demarcation (1980), stone door in the form of Glagolitic letter L, through which a road runs and around which stones are scattered forming Glagolitic letters, spelling the words of Istrian Demarcation
 Wall of Croatian Protestants and Heretics - a stone clepsydra with names of Croatian Protestants
 Resting Place of Žakan Juraj - commemorating the first Croatian printed book in seven stone chairs forming the letters that spell the name of Žakan Juraj
 Monument to Resistance and Freedom (1979) - three stone blocks representing the Antiquity, Middle Ages and Modern Period
 City Gates - a copper door with bucrania, knocker and a calendar, showing the work in the field for each month of the year

Gallery of the monuments

References

Monuments and memorials in Croatia
Cultural history of Croatia
Buildings and structures in Istria County
Tourist attractions in Istria County